Goosegrass (sometimes goose grass) is a common name for several grasses,  sedges, and annual herbs. The origin of the name is due either to a plant's use as food for geese or plant parts that look like the foot of a goose.

Goosegrass may refer to:
 Acrachne, genus of grass
 Carex eleusinoides, goosegrass sedge
 Carex lenticularis, goosegrass sedge
 Eleusine, genus of grass
 Eleusine indica,  Indian goosegrass, also called wiregrass
 Galium aparine, also referred to as "cleavers"
 Galium murale, small goosegrass
 Puccinellia fasciculata, saltmarsh goosegrass